Josip Lisac (born 23 November 1950), is a Croatian linguist and dialectologist.

Biography
He was born in 1950 in Turni near Delnice, Gorski kotar. After graduating in philosophy and Yugoslav studies at the Faculty of Philosophy, University of Zadar in 1974, he received a Ph.D. at the same institution in 1986, with a thesis on the Kajkavian dialects of Gorski kotar.

After working as a journalist for four years immediately after graduation, in 1978 he returned to the Faculty of Philosophy in Zadar to work as an assistant. In 1987 he received the title of docent, in 1989 becoming associate professor, and in 1997 receiving regular and finally in 2002 permanent professorship. He teaches or has taught several post-graduate courses on linguistics, and serves as a head of the post-graduate course in linguistics at the University of Zadar. At the same university he was the first head of the Department for Croatian and Slavic Studies. In 2004 he became an associate member of the Croatian Academy of Sciences and Arts.

Work
His chief scientific interest is in dialectology and in the history of Croatian. He contributed to several international projects on linguistic geography. He has published approximately a thousand bibliographical units, including several books:

 Fonološki opisi srpskohrvatskih / hrvatskosrpskih, slovenačkih i makedonskih govora obuhvaćenih Opšteslovenskim lingvističkim atlasom, Sarajevo, 1981 (as a contributor)
 Hrvatska drama do narodnog preporoda (co-authored with Slobodan Prosperov Novak), I-II, Split, 1984
 Hrvatski jezik i njegovi proučavatelji, Split, 1994
 Hrvatski dijalekti i jezična povijest, Zagreb, 1996;
 Poezija Dragutina Domjanića; Z mojih bregov Frana Galovića; Ognji i rože Ivana Gorana Kovačića (with Miroslav Šicel and Dunja Detoni-Dujmić), Zagreb, 1996
 Hrvatski govori, filolozi, pisci, Zagreb, 1999
 Dalibor Brozović, dobitnik nagrade "Stjepan Ivšić, Zagreb - Zadar, 2002
 Hrvatska dijalektologija 1. Hrvatski dijalekti i govori štokavskog narječja i hrvatski govori torlačkog narječja, Zagreb, 2003
 Faust Vrančić i drugi, Šibenik, 2004
 Tragom zavičaja. Delnički govor i govor Gornjih Turni u svjetlosti goranskih kajkavskih govora, Split, 2006
 Hrvatska dijalektologija 2 - Čakavsko narječje, Zagreb, 2009

With Dunja Fališevac and Darko Novaković he edited the anthology Hrvatska književna baština (2002–2005). At the University of Zadar he was the initiator and the editor-in-chief of the journal Croatica et Slavica Iadertina. He currently serves as an editor of the magazine Čakavska rič. and also collaborates on the publications of the Miroslav Krleža Lexicographical Institute. He edited reprints of many works of Croatian writers and philologists (Faust Vrančić, Jakov Pletikosa, Stjepan Ivšić, Vinko Nikolić, Zlatko Pochobradsky). In collaboration with sister Terezija Zemljić he published a chronicle of Šibenik's female Franciscans Knjigu od uspomene (Šibenik, 2005).

References

External links
 Bibliography

Linguists from Croatia
Slavists
University of Zadar alumni
1950 births
Living people